was a village located in the former Kitaaizu District, Fukushima Prefecture, Japan.

On November 1, 2004, Kitaaizu was merged into the expanded city of Aizuwakamatsu and no longer exists as an independent municipality.

As of 2003, the village had an estimated population of 7,603 and a density of 269.80 persons per km². The total area was 28.18 km².

External links
 Official website of Aizuwakamatsu in Japanese (English version)

Dissolved municipalities of Fukushima Prefecture
Aizuwakamatsu